The Council of the Indies was a body established in 1610 to advise and limit the powers of the governor-general of the Dutch East Indies. Following administrative reforms of 1836, the council was later renamed as the Council of the Dutch East Indies.

Initially the council had four members and a chairman, all Dutch nationals. In 1930, this was increased to six people, with citizens of the Dutch East Indies eligible for membership. The council was chaired by the governor-general. The Dutch monarch had the authority to make a final decision in the event of a disagreement between the governor-general and the council.

Prior to 1836, the council had the same standing as the governor-general, but that year, its role was reduced to that of an advisory body. It regained some of its powers in 1854, when an act was passed obliging the governor-general to consult it before taking major measures, but he was still under no obligation to heed its advice. Its powers were reduced again in 1925, but the governor-general still had to consult it before taking certain actions, including making announcements or sending proposals to the semi-legislative Volksraad.

In a report sent to Governor-General Alidius Tjarda van Starkenborgh Stachouwer in 1938, the council recommended rejection of the Soetardjo Petition, which had been signed by a number of members of the Volksraad and that asked for a conference to be organised to discuss the autonomy for the Dutch East Indies as part of a Dutch commonwealth. The council took the view that the demands of the petition were at odds with the Dutch constitution and that Indonesia was not ready to become a dominion.

Membership

Notes

References
 
 
 
 
 
 
 
 
 

Gouvernements of the Dutch East Indies
17th-century establishments in Indonesia
1610 establishments in Asia